The University of Maryland, College Park  is a public research university in College Park, Maryland, US.

University of Maryland may also refer to:
University of Maryland, Baltimore, a university that focuses on graduate professional education
University of Maryland, Baltimore County, Catonsville, a research-extensive university
University of Maryland Eastern Shore, Princess Anne, a historically black university 
University of Maryland Global Campus, Adelphi, a university that focuses on instructor-led, continuing and distance education for non-traditional students

See also
List of colleges and universities in Maryland